Mark Pilkington may refer to:

Mark Pilkington (golfer) (born 1978), Welsh professional golfer
Mark Pilkington (writer) (born 1973), English writer